Alex or Alexander or Alexandra Taylor may refer to:

People

Actors and theatrical professionals
 Alex Taylor, stage name used by pornographic actress Adriana Molinari (born 1970)
 Alex Cole Taylor, acting teacher

Businesspeople
 Alex Taylor (businessman) (1853–1916), Canadian entrepreneur, inventor and politician
 Alexander C. Taylor, American businessman, CEO of Cox Enterprises

Politicians
 Alex Taylor (Australian politician) (1906–1976), Australian politician
 Alex Taylor (Canadian politician) (born 1936), Canadian politician
 Alexander Donald Taylor (born 1928), Australian politician
 Alexander Wilson Taylor (1815–1893), US Representative from Pennsylvania

Sportspeople
 Alex Taylor (American football) (born 1997), American football offensive tackle
 Alex Taylor (footballer) (born 1962), Scottish footballer
 Alex Taylor (rugby union) (born 1990), New Zealand rugby union player
 Alexandra Taylor (born 1994), Cypriot alpine skier

Other people
 Alex Taylor (British Army officer) (born 1970), British Army major general
 Alex Taylor (singer) (1947–1993), American singer, brother of James Taylor
 Alexander Taylor (physician) (1802–1879), Scottish physician active in France
 Alexander Burt Taylor (1904–1972), Registrar General for Scotland
 Alexander Smith Taylor (1817–1876), American author and historian of California

Characters
 Alex Taylor (Third Watch character) (Alexandra), played by actress Amy Carlson

See also
 Alec Tayler (1892–1964), Australian rules footballer
 Alexis Taylor (born 1980), British musician
 Alastair Taylor (disambiguation)
 Taylor (disambiguation)